Ebbtide is a 1994 Australian direct-to-video film

Plot
Lawyer Jeff Warren takes over a compensation case after the sudden death of one of his partners.

Production
Screenwriter Bob Ellis later claimed the original script "was a really terrific Chandleresque film noir that bears no resemblance to the eventual film." He asked to be credited as "Robert Ellis".

Director Craig Lahiff:
Bob did a script and it was very difficult to raise money for it. It was more of a personal film. It had a particular style to it which might have been better if Bob had shot and directed. But in the end, because I'd spent a lot of money and time on it, we tried to give it a different approach and got another writer, Peter Goldsworthy.
The film was co-financed by the American Broadcasting Company. Lahiff:
They had a fair bit of script involvement and also casting, so I ended up with Harry Hamlin as lead. He wasn't my choice of actor, and while he was very good to get on with, it changed the feel of the film, whereas I would probably have done it in quite a different style and cast other people differently as well. It was just a matter of completing the film and doing the best I could and trying a few stylistic things.

References

External links

Ebbtide at Oz Movies

1994 thriller films
1994 direct-to-video films
1994 films
Australian thriller films
1990s English-language films
1990s Australian films